Martin Braxenthaler (born 11 March 1972) is a German monoskier and Paralympian. He has participated in alpine skiing at four Winter Paralympic Games, in 1998, 2002, 2006 and 2010. He won a bronze medal at the 1998 Winter Paralympics, four golds at the 2002 Games, three more golds at the 2006 Torino Paralympics and three golds and one silver at the 2010 Vancouver Paralympics.

In 2007 he was named the Laureus World Sports Award for Sportsperson with a Disability of the Year and won the Sitting element of the IPC Disabled Alpine World Cup. At the 2010 Winter Paralympics, Braxenthaler won three gold, as well as one silver medal.

When asked about being "the most successful mono-skier in the history of the Paralympic movement", Braxenthaler replied:

References

Sources
 www.newdisability.com

External links
 
 

1972 births
Living people
German male alpine skiers
Paralympic alpine skiers of Germany
Paralympic medalists in alpine skiing
Paralympic gold medalists for Germany
Paralympic silver medalists for Germany
Paralympic bronze medalists for Germany
Alpine skiers at the 1998 Winter Paralympics
Alpine skiers at the 2002 Winter Paralympics
Alpine skiers at the 2006 Winter Paralympics
Alpine skiers at the 2010 Winter Paralympics
Medalists at the 1998 Winter Paralympics
Medalists at the 2002 Winter Paralympics
Medalists at the 2006 Winter Paralympics
Medalists at the 2010 Winter Paralympics
People from Traunstein
Sportspeople from Upper Bavaria
Place of birth missing (living people)